The 1997 Legg Mason Tennis Classic was a men's tennis tournament played on outdoor hard courts in Washington, D.C., United States, that was part of the Championship Series of the 1997 ATP Tour. It was the 28th edition of the tournament and was held from July 14 through July 20, 1997. First-seeded Michael Chang won the singles title and $90,000 first-prize money.

Finals

Singles

 Michael Chang defeated  Petr Korda 5–7, 6–2, 6–1

Doubles

 Luke Jensen /   Murphy Jensen defeated  Neville Godwin /  Fernon Wibier 6–4, 6–4

References

External links
 ATP tournament profile

Legg Mason
Washington Open (tennis)
1997 in sports in Washington, D.C.
1997 in American tennis